Palacios del Arzobispo (Spanish for "Palaces of the Archbishop") is a village and municipality in the province of Salamanca in western Spain, part of the autonomous community of Castile and León.

Geography

The postal code is 37111.

Culture
Every year a fiesta is held on June 24 to commemorate John the Baptist.

See also
List of municipalities in Salamanca

References

Municipalities in the Province of Salamanca